The 1997 international cricket season was from May 1997 to September 1997.

Season overview

May

Pepsi Independence Cup 1997

Australia in England

June

Sri Lanka in the West Indies

July

Asia Cup 1997

August

India in Sri Lanka

September

Sahara Cup 1997

References

 
1997 in cricket